Wade Randolph Hampton is an American DJ, film and music producer and recording artist. He is known for his contributions to electronic music and his involvement in the development of the North American rave scene.

Early life

Wade grew up in Dallas, Texas and discovered his love of music at an early age. During his high school years, his taste for electronic music in particular was inspired by DJs at the legendary club, the Starck, watching highly influential DJ Rick Squillante and Go-GO Mike DuPriest. Wade began regularly DJing warehouse parties near the University of North Texas, in Denton, in 1985, eventually playing small clubs on the campus itself. Two years later he would open his first nightclub, Westend, with another Starck Club DJ and lifelong mentor Kerry Jaggers, in Austin, Texas.

Following the explosion of electronic music in America in the early to mid ‘80s, he moved to Chicago in 1988, epicenter of the house music movement. As house music grew from its smaller roots to become an international musical genre, so did Wade’s involvement in the burgeoning warehouse party scene. 
He quickly launched acid jazz/balearic/soul weeklies at prototype ultralounge VooDoo, Wade's World at Shelter where he also assisted the club's director, Michael Blatter, with initiating Outlaw parties from New York City’s Project X magazine.

It was at this time that Wade developed close friendships with DJs that are now widely known internationally, including Derrick Carter, Mixmaster Morris, John Digweed, Vince Lawrence, Mark Farina, Spencer Kincey, Diz, DJ Colette, Heather, Dayhota and DJ Keoki.

Los Angeles, 1991–1994

Splitting time between Chicago and Los Angeles in 1991 again coincided with the rapid spread of electronic music subculture. Wade and partner Patty Ryan, along with crew Blue Sky Corporation launched Chicago’s historic Life parties in September of 1991. Later in November of that same year, Wade took LA streetwear phenomenon Freshjive on the road with an event at Chicago’s Cabaret Metro, featuring U.K. DJ’s John Digweed, Keoki, alongside Chicago’s Mark Farina and Derrick. It was on April 18, 1992 that events took a groundbreaking turn, notably his coproduction of the Circa series of massive events, a partnership with L.A. artists Richard Duardo and Tef Foo that would come to define the American rave scene. Incorporating art, music and technology utilizing traditional performance visual elements such as lighting, video, lasers and graphic design, as well as, literary work from notable writers Timothy Leary, Robert Anton Wilson and Terrence McKenna within the promotion and actual live production via LED transmission. It was this relationship between the music and art scenes that would offer legitimacy to the previously termed, ‘underground scene’ as Mr. Duardo successfully placed one-night-only productions from the crew in Los Angeles Museum of Contemporary Art and Los Angeles Contemporary Exhibition. The team also became available for high-profile event production, including Jean Paul Gaultier’s first social event in the U.S. at the Shrine Auditorium, hosted by Madonna.

LA in 1991 would also prove to be the setting in which Wade developed a friendship with psychologist Timothy Leary, a relationship that would last until Leary’s death in 1996, as Wade would go on to DJ at his private funeral memorial at his home in Beverly Hills.

It was at Circa 92 that he would also begin his longstanding relationship with the Hardkiss Brothers, an event that would lead to eventual management and many collaborations. At the end of that year, Wade would present Louder Than Words at the legendary Rainbow Roller Rink featuring a rare West Coast and Midwestern lineup in collaboration with Derrick May’s Transmat Records, San Francisco’s Hardkiss Music and Chicago’s Rednail House Crew. The lineup included Scott Hardkiss, Robbie Hardkiss, Mark Farina, Derrick Carter and a live performance from Stacey Pullen and Silent Phase.

San Francisco, Park City and return to Dallas

During the mid ‘90s he moved to San Francisco cementing his status as a representative of the west coast electronic scene, and moving in with the Hardkiss Brothers in 1994. After signing a record label distribution deal in 1995 with Moonshine Music to launch Domestic Recordings, which would feature his own works under the monikers ‘W’ and ‘Wish FM’, delving in multiple genres such as deep house, drum and bass, dub and nu jazz. He would also release albums from acts such as Mark Farina, Symbiosis and Westside Chemical. After moving the operation from L.A. to San Francisco in 1996, he would also have success with his weekly night ‘La Belle Epoque’ at The Top, and with his Lower Haight Street retail store Faster Bamboo.

By 1998 he was releasing albums through other labels, Northern California electronic label Zoe Magik and Hardkiss imprint Sunburn/Lightyear/WEA. The success of these ventures led to performance opportunities at major festivals across North and Central America, such as Ultra Music Festival, Electric Daisy Carnival, Nocturnal Wonderland, Planet New Year, Cyberfest, ACA World Music Festival in Acapulco and most recently in 2013 and 2014 on the main stage at Lights All Night.

From 2000–2004 Wade maintained a home in Park City, Utah where he produced shows at Harry O's (now Park City Live). It was in this city that he also formed longstanding relationship with Paul Oakenfold and the two consistently presented highly celebrated duo performances at Sundance Film Festival, as well as, an opening night show at of 2002 Winter Olympics. They have continued this tradition to this day, performing together on 4 turntables at the 2012 SXSW music festival in Austin, Texas.

From 2006–2012 Wade served as a Director for Dallas’ Ghostbar nightclub, on top of the W Hotel. Notable events he produced there included DJ residency with the late DJ AM on Tuesdays called The Seduction, LeBron James and Jay Z’s Two Kings during the 2010 NBA All Star week, back-to-back sets with Tiesto for Super Bowl XLV, multiple opening performances with LMFAO, as Dj for Mickey Avalon’s live performance, with Timbaland and Justin Timberlake and other notable shows to include Erykah Badu, Steve Aoki, Jazzy Jeff, Public Enemy, Dave Chappelle and Cisco Adler.

Film Industry

Wade’s first involvement with the film industry was in 1997, creating the score for the European TV advertising campaign for the Mercedes Benz A-Class automobile, which would eventually go on to be the best-selling car of all time for the German automaker. The following year he produced the soundtrack for Swiss energy drink Isostar TV advertisement which premiered during the 1998 FIFA World Cup in France. In 2000, he made his acting debut in the electronic music film Groove, where he played himself (as WishFM), alongside fellow DJ John Digweed. The film was the very first sale on opening night of the 1999 Sundance Film Festival, purchased by Sony Pictures Classics. He also produced the soundtrack for the film, which was nominated for ‘Best Film Under $500,000’ at the 2001 Independent Spirit Awards. Amazon.com listed the Groove Soundtrack in two different categories of 2000 Editor's Picks, for both Best DJ Album and Best Soundtrack Album. A year later he worked on the Requiem for a Dream Remixed album from Darren Aronofsky’s Oscar-winning film. In 2006, he was Music Supervisor on the film TV Junkie, which won the ‘Special Grand Jury Prize for a Documentary’ at Sundance Film Festival, while showcasing his own music along with Jackson 5, Spiritualized and Explosions in the Sky.

He is music supervisor, producer and original score composer on the upcoming documentary The Starck Club, about the rise and enduring legacy of the Dallas nightclub, a project for which he also created the original score.

Wade currently resides in Los Angeles, where he continues to focus on film and music production, operating film, TV and music company Silent Partner Films.

Discography

References

External links
 http://thewishfm.com
 http://www.discogs.com/artist/96404-Wade-Randolph-Hampton
 https://www.imdb.com/name/nm0359069/

American DJs
Year of birth missing (living people)
Living people